Abdul Naza Alhassan (born 17 June 1990 in Ghana) is a Ghanaian football player who played for Ghana Premier League side Kessben F.C.

Career
Alhassan began his career Maxbees FC and joined in January 2008 to Wa All Stars, after 6 months leave the club and moved to J2 League team Shonan Bellmare.

International career
He played for U-17 Ghana national team in 2007 FIFA U-17 World Cup in Korea Republic.

References

External links

Fifa Profile

1990 births
Living people
Ghanaian footballers
Ghanaian expatriate footballers
Expatriate footballers in Japan
J2 League players
Shonan Bellmare players
Legon Cities FC players
Medeama SC players
Association football midfielders